Abrie Schutte (11 February 1937 – 5 July 2003) was a South African boxer. He competed in the men's light middleweight event at the 1960 Summer Olympics. At the 1960 Summer Olympics, he lost to John Bukowski of Australia.

References

1937 births
2003 deaths
South African male boxers
Olympic boxers of South Africa
Boxers at the 1960 Summer Olympics
People from Springs, Gauteng
Light-middleweight boxers
Sportspeople from Gauteng